Karla Vreš (born January 8, 1999) is a Croatian professional basketball player.

References

External links
 Profile at eurobasket.com

1999 births
Living people
Basketball players from Zagreb
Croatian women's basketball players
Small forwards
Centers (basketball)